Maciej Nuckowski (Greek: Μάτσεϊ Νουτσκόφσκι; born 21 March 1976 in Poland) is a Polish retired footballer who now works as owner at Zante Magic Tours in Greece.

Career

Nuckowski started his senior career with Zawisza Bydgoszcz. In 2005, he signed for Ross County in the Scottish Championship, where he made fifteen appearances and scored one goal. After that, he played for Israeli club Hapoel Bnei Lod, and Greek clubs A.P.S. Zakynthos, Panegialios, PAS Lamia 1964 Fokikos, and Eordaikos 2007 before retiring in 2010.

References

External links 
 Wise men came from the east
 Football: TAKE TWO FOR FIFERS' POLISH HOPEFUL
 Football: Robbo has big hopes for Magic
 "Nucek" ° do Szkocji
 Jak zdobywca goli, zdobył grecką wyspę Zakynthos. Czyli Maciej Nuckowski w raju
 Polak w greckim raju. Były piłkarz został prężnym biznesmenem na Zakinthos
 Grał w polskiej Ekstraklasie, a teraz prowadzi spokojne życie w Grecji
 Skąd się wzięliśmy na Zakynthos?
 Maciej Nuckowski: Chciałbym grać w ŁKS
 Πιλότος… ο Νουτσκόφσκι
 Νουτσκόφσκι: «Θέλω να παίξω σε ομάδα που κάνει πρωταθλητισμό"
 Ο Νούτσκο... μάνατζερ στην Παναχαική
 Πρόβλημα με Νουτσκόφσκι, εκτός με Επανομή
 Rozmowa z pikarzem Lecha Maciejem Nuckowskim
 Nie czuję żalu - rozmowa z Maciejem Nuckowskim
 Nuckowski: Nie wolno być pazernym
 W niedzielę Radomiak - ŁKS: W ataku zagra Nuckowski
 Polish Wikipedia Page
 football Profile
 The Staggie Archive Profile

Association football wingers
Living people
1976 births
Expatriate footballers in Germany
Expatriate footballers in Greece
Expatriate footballers in Israel
Expatriate footballers in Scotland
Polish footballers
Polish expatriate footballers
Dyskobolia Grodzisk Wielkopolski players
Fokikos A.C. players
Hapoel Bnei Lod F.C. players
Lech Poznań players
ŁKS Łódź players
Panegialios F.C. players
PAS Lamia 1964 players
Polonia Warsaw players
Ross County F.C. players
Zagłębie Lubin players
Zawisza Bydgoszcz players